The Old Masonic Temple in Trenton, Mercer County, New Jersey, United States,  is a historic building built in 1793 at the corner of Front and Willow (or Barrack) streets near the New Jersey State House, and across the street from the Old Barracks. 
In 1915 when a new building was constructed for the Trenton Lodge, the old building was moved half a block south to 102 Barrack Street.  It has served as a Masonic Lodge, a school, a shop for a furnisher and upholsterer, a museum, and is now a tourist information center. In 1970 the building became part of the State House Historic District listed by the National Register of Historic Places.

References

External links
 HABS drawings, photos and data

Buildings and structures in Trenton, New Jersey
Clubhouses on the National Register of Historic Places in New Jersey
Historic district contributing properties in New Jersey
Houses completed in 1793
Former Masonic buildings in New Jersey
National Register of Historic Places in Trenton, New Jersey